Century Nursing College, Poinachi is a professional campus in Kasaragod.

History
The college was established in 2003. It has an affiliation with Kannur University.

Courses offered
 B.Sc. in Nursing: 50 seats

Contact Information
 Address:  Century College of Nursing. Poinachi, (P.O) Thekkil, Kasaragod, 671541.
 Principal : Prof. Parimala K. Samuel

References

Colleges affiliated to Kannur University
Colleges in Kasaragod district
Nursing schools in India